Hein Latt (born 21 November  1948) is a  Burmese national writer and journalism. He is one of the famous writer in Myanmar.

At 2002, he received Myanmar National Literature Award  from his book  Third World to First World. He has published More than literature articles 3,000 and 93 novels.

Biography 
Hein Latt born on 21 November 1948 in Yangon. He graduated Library Diploma  from the Yangon University . He served as  an assistant librarian at the University of Agriculture and as Librarian and research officer at the Myanmar Education Association.

Since 1965, he has authored over 3,000 literature articles and 93 novels. He received Myanmar National Literature Award from his book Third World to First World.

From 1997 to 2009, he had served as editor of the Popular Journal and as  the Vice President of Asean Fame Media Group in 2010.

Books

World Writers and Their Letters (1997)
World's Love Letters (2001)
World's Most Famous Disasters (1993)
To be rich always to be rich (1997)
Wealth Education (1997)
The Gambia Astrology Project (1998)
Political History of the Cape (1977)
In the middle of the mound (2001)
Literature Interview (1) (1999)
The Search for Peace (1995)
Mind and Gambari (2001)
How to Cope With Mind (2001)
Political History for Sultan Chandra (1979)
Swami Vickyka Nanda (1984)
The Zinskyky Political Biography (1979)
The Goals of the Goat (1978)
Taro Gambira (1999)
Citizens of the People's Republic of China (1982)
Famous Entrepreneurs (1998)
Dissertation (2001)
Third World to First World
Twentieth Century Western Literature (1972)
English Speaking Story
Illustrated English Dictionary
Slowly Come Aged (2000)
Creating Value for Life (2000)
Modern US - English -
Capital Business English
Secular education (1996)
Activism (1993) 
Events (1994)
Consciousness and Literature (1998)
Best English English Grammar -
White Love (Black ) (1978)
American English
English explanation
English (Talk English)
English-Speaking and Healing Litigation
English speaking dictionary
English-speaking idiom
How to say in English (How to say + What to say)
How to write in English
Let's talk easy in English
-Different types of English sentences
English grammar
English grammar lessons
English Thinking English
Portable English Speaker
20th Century West Literature
World Literature
Maoist biography
Biography
Michelle Obama
Hillary Clinton
From the Third World to Geography
President Ahmadinejad and Iran nuclear deal (March 2010)
Dear Leader Kim Jong Il or North Korea (May 2010)
CIA World Cup (CIA Final) (March 2011)
Obama's War (August 2011)
Salvation for Israel (September 2011)
Israelite adventurer
China is ruling the world
Success eyes
Mapless Road (personal history of South Korea's President Irrawaddy) (July 2012)
A Day That Was Not Easy (The Venezuelan 
Assassination of Osama bin Laden) (October 2012)

References

1948 births
Living people
Burmese writers
People from Yangon Region
20th-century Burmese writers
University of Yangon alumni
21st-century Burmese writers